Live by Request is a television show on the A&E Network from 1996 to 2004. On it, notable artists hold concerts where the set list would be determined by viewer phone calls.  The show was created based on an idea by Tony Bennett.  Bennett starred in its first episode, which ran on Valentine's Day 1996; during that episode, 1.5 million calls came in from viewers with requests.  The show won the Emmy Award for Individual Performance in a Variety or Music Program in 1996.  It also won a CableACE Award. Mark McEwen hosted the show.

Johnny Mathis appearance holds the record for the most viewers watching on live TV and is now available on DVD release.
 
Some the show's performances would be released as albums of the same name by the artists, including:
Blondie
k.d. lang (2000)
Kenny Rogers
Tony Bennett (1997)
Barry Manilow (2003)

Other performers on the show, which has run on an as-appropriate basis, have included Johnny Mathis, Chicago (band), Hall & Oates, David Bowie, Elvis Costello, Eurythmics, The Bee Gees,  John Fogerty, Don Henley, Elton John, B. B. King, Lyle Lovett, John Mellencamp, Vince Gill, Santana, Gloria Estefan, Phil Collins, Michael Bolton, Neil Diamond, James Taylor, Trisha Yearwood, Reba McEntire, Earth, Wind & Fire, and Vanessa Williams.

In November 2009, PBS broadcast a John Fogerty concert under the Live By Request series as a pledge drive event.

References

External links
Episode summaries by A&E

Pop music television series
A&E (TV network) original programming
1997 American television series debuts
2004 American television series endings
English-language television shows